Pierre Canavèse (born 10 September 1945) is a French former freestyle swimmer. He competed in two events at the 1964 Summer Olympics.

References

External links
 

1945 births
Living people
French male freestyle swimmers
Olympic swimmers of France
Swimmers at the 1964 Summer Olympics
Place of birth missing (living people)